James Hernon (6 December 1924 – 7 March 2009) was a Scottish footballer who played as a winger for four teams in the English Football League in the immediate post-Second World War years.

Born in Cleland, Hernon was spotted by a Leicester City scout in 1942, and signed for the Foxes shortly afterwards. He made his debut in a wartime match against Crystal Palace. In 1943, he was called into service and served in the Royal Artillery and saw action in France, Belgium and Germany.

At the end of the war, Hernon resumed his football career at Leicester, and in 1948, he was sold to Bolton Wanderers for a £16,000 transfer fee – which was Britain's second-highest transfer fee at the time. Hernon spent three years at Burnden Park, before being signed by Grimsby Town manager Bill Shankly in 1951 for a £2,500 transfer fee.

In 1954, after three years at Grimsby, Hernon moved to Watford, where he spent two seasons before a knee injury forced him to retire from the professional game. He later resumed his career at non-league Hastings United, before injuries forced him to quit the game for good in 1957.

After retiring from football, Hernon settled in Hastings, and went on to become a salesman, chauffeur and school caretaker. He died on 7 March 2009, aged 84.

References
 Obituary

1924 births
2009 deaths
People from Cleland, North Lanarkshire
Association football wingers
Scottish footballers
Leicester City F.C. players
Bolton Wanderers F.C. players
Grimsby Town F.C. players
Watford F.C. players
Hastings United F.C. (1948) players
English Football League players
Footballers from North Lanarkshire
British Army personnel of World War II
Royal Artillery personnel
Military personnel from North Lanarkshire